The Sun Fast 1/2 Ton, also called the Jeanneau 1/2 Ton, is a French sailboat that was designed by Tony Castro as an International Offshore Rule Half Ton class racer and first built in 1984.

The Sun Fast 1/2 Ton's prototype was named Sun Fast and the design was the first boat in the Sun Fast sailboat range.

The even though only ten boats were built, the design was developed into the Arcadia 30 and the Sun Way 28.

Production
The design was built by Jeanneau in France as a  limited edition, with ten boats completed between 1984 to 1986, but it is now out of production.

Design
The Sun Fast 1/2 Ton is a racing keelboat, built predominantly of fiberglass, with a carbon fiber or Kevlar-reinforced hull and deck factory options. It has a fractional sloop rig. The hull has a raked stem, a walk-through reverse transom, an internally mounted spade-type rudder controlled by a tiller and a fixed fin keel. It displaces  and carries  of lead ballast.

The design has minimal sleeping accommodation for four people, with four straight settees in the main cabin. The galley is located forward on the port side and the boat's centerline. The galley is equipped with a two-burner stove and a sink.

Operational history
The boat is supported by an active class club that organizes racing events, the Half Ton Class.

See also
List of sailing boat types

References

Keelboats
1980s sailboat type designs
Sailing yachts
Sailboat type designs by Tony Castro
Sailboat types built by Jeanneau